MF & DAZN: X Series 001 features KSI vs Swarmz and KSI vs Luis Alcaraz Pineda, billed as 2 Fights 1 Night, which were a pair of exhibition crossover boxing matches contested between British YouTuber KSI, British rapper Swarmz and Mexican boxer Luis Alcaraz Pineda. The bout took place on 27 August 2022, at The O2 Arena in London, England.

Background 

On 17 July 2022, it was announced that British KSI and American YouTuber Alex Wassabi were scheduled to fight in a exhibition boxing match on 27 August at The O2 Arena in London.

However, on 7 August, Wassabi pulled out of the bout due to a concussion. British rapper Swarmz was subsequently announced as Wassabi's replacement. 

On 17 August, KSI was confirmed to be facing Bulgarian boxer Ivan Nikolov on the same night. It was then discovered that Nikolov was a white supremacist and Neo-Nazi, however, and he was subsequently removed from the card. He was replaced by Mexican boxer Luis Alcaraz Pineda.

Card 
The card for the fight, consisting of the main event and co-main events was released on 15 July 2022 and consisted KSI vs Swarmz & Luis Alcaraz Pineda and FaZe Temperrr vs Slim Albaher. The undercard consists of Deji vs Fousey, King Kenny vs FaZe Sensei, Salt Papi vs Andy Warski, Sam Hyde vs IAmThmpsn, and Deen the Great vs Evil Hero.

Fight details

Professional rules 
Despite not appearing on BoxRec, CEO Mams Taylor confirmed that each fight would follow the rules of professional boxing which included no headgear and 10 oz gloves.

ICB titles 
The Influencer Championship Boxing titles were announced on 23 July 2022 by the Professional Boxing Association, who were sanctioning the event, and are a way to further separate influencer boxing and traditional boxing. For 27 August 4 title fights were announced, KSI vs Swarmz for the ICB World cruiserweight, Deen the Great vs Evil Hero for the ICB North American welterweight title, King Kenny vs FaZe Sensei for the ICB International cruiserweight title, and FaZe Temperrr vs Slim Albaher for the ICB World light-heavyweight title.

KSI's two fights 
During the announcement video regarding the second opponent, KSI read out a statement provided by the Professional Boxing Association which stated "if the doctor says (KSI's) unfit to fight the second fight because of a clash of heads or a giant cut or a concussion, then KSI will be unable to do the second fight" which will result in a no contest. The PBA have also stated "we must stress that for an influencer boxing twice on the night, people shouldn't think that this is the norm, even though it is happening. This can't be seen as a new normal at all... This is influencer boxing and is fully regulated and sanctioned."

Fight card

Broadcasting

MF & DAZN: X Series 002 
During the broadcast, it was announced that Hasim Rahman Jr. would take on Vitor Belfort in Misfit's second event, MF & DAZN: X Series 002 at Sheffield Arena, Sheffield, England on 15 October 2022. The fight was eventually postponed to MF & DAZN: X Series 003 and replaced by Jay Swingler vs Cherdleys.

Notes

References

External links

2022 in boxing
Boxing matches
Crossover boxing events
DAZN
KSI
Pay-per-view boxing matches
YouTube Boxing events
YouTube
2022 in Internet culture
Boxing in England